Chryseobacterium halperniae  is a Gram-negative, rod-shaped, aerobic and non-motile bacteria from the genus of Chryseobacterium which has been isolated from raw cow milk in Israel.

References

External links
Type strain of Chryseobacterium halperniae at BacDive -  the Bacterial Diversity Metadatabase

halperniae
Bacteria described in 2010